The women's  100 metre freestyle event at the 1994 World Aquatics Championships took place 5 September and 6 September .

Results

Heats
The heats were held on 5 September.

Finals

Final B
The final B was held on 6 September.

Final A
The final A was held on 6 September.

References

USASwimming

Swimming at the 1994 World Aquatics Championships